The 1988 NBA draft took place on June 28, 1988, in New York City, New York. The length was reduced from seven rounds in the previous year to three rounds. This was also the first draft for the Charlotte Hornets and Miami Heat, prior to their inaugural season.

Draft

Notable undrafted players
This section is for players who were eligible for the 1988 NBA draft, did not get selected, but still later appeared in at least one NBA regular season or postseason game.

Notes
On June 23, 1988, the Heat received the 1988 NBA Draft first-round draft pick from the Dallas Mavericks for not picking centers Bill Wennington and Uwe Blab or guard Steve Alford in the 1988 NBA Expansion Draft.

On June 23, 1988, the Heat received the 1988 NBA Draft second-round draft pick from the Seattle SuperSonics for not selecting guard Danny Young in the 1988 NBA Expansion Draft.

Early entrants

College underclassmen
The following college basketball players successfully applied for early draft entrance.

  Marvin Alexander – F, Memphis (junior)
  Rex Chapman – G, Kentucky (sophomore)
  Sylvester Gray – F, Memphis (sophomore)
  Tito Horford – C, Miami (Florida) (sophomore)
  Mike Jones – F, Auburn (junior)
  Jerome Lane – F, Pittsburgh (junior)
  Dwayne Lewis – G, Marshall (junior)
  Charles Shackleford – F/C, NC State (junior)
  Rod Strickland – G, DePaul (junior)

Other eligible players

See also
 List of first overall NBA draft picks

References

External links
 1988 NBA Draft

Draft
National Basketball Association draft
NBA draft
NBA draft
1980s in Manhattan
Basketball in New York City
Sporting events in New York City
Sports in Manhattan
Madison Square Garden